This is a list of public school districts in Tennessee, sorted alphabetically.

A
Alamo City Schools
Alcoa City Schools
Anderson County Schools
Arlington Community Schools
Athens City Elementary Schools

B
Bartlett City Schools
Bedford County Schools
Bells City Schools
Benton County Schools
Bledsoe County Schools
Blount County Schools
Bradford Special Schools
Bradley County Schools
Bristol City Schools

C
Campbell County Schools
Cannon County Schools
Carroll County Schools
Carter County Schools
Cheatham County Schools
Chester County Schools
Claiborne County Schools
Clarksville-Montgomery County School System
Clay County Schools
Cleveland City Schools
Cocke County Schools
Coffee County Schools
Crockett County Schools
Cumberland County Schools

D
Dayton City Schools
Decatur County Schools
Dekalb County Schools
Dickson County Schools
Dyer County Schools
Dyersburg City Schools

E
Elizabethton City Schools
Etowah City Elementary Schools

F
Fayette County Schools
Fayetteville City Elementary Schools
Fentress County Schools
Franklin County Schools
Franklin Special School District

G
Gibson County Special School District
Giles County Schools
Grainger County Schools
Greene County Schools
Greeneville City Schools
Grundy County Schools

H
Hamblen County Schools
Hamilton County Schools
Hancock County Schools
Hardeman County Schools
Hardin County Schools
Hawkins County Schools
Haywood County Schools
Henderson County Schools
Henry County Schools
Hickman County Schools
Hollow Rock-Bruceton Special School District
Houston County Schools
Humboldt City Schools
Humphreys County Schools
Huntingdon Special Schools

J
Jackson County Schools
Jackson-Madison Consolidated Schools
Jefferson County Schools
Johnson City Schools
Johnson County Schools

K
Kingsport City Schools
Knox County Schools

L
Lake County School System
Lauderdale County Schools
Lawrence County Schools
Lebanon Special School District
Lenoir City Schools
Lewis County Schools
Lexington City Elementary Schools
Lincoln County Schools
Loudon County Schools

M
Macon County Schools
Manchester City Schools
Marion County Schools
Marshall County Schools
Maryville City Schools
Maury County Schools
McKenzie Special School District
McMinn County Schools
McNairy County Schools
Meigs County Schools
Memphis City Schools
Metropolitan Nashville Public Schools
Milan Special School District
Monroe County Schools
Montgomery County Schools
Moore County Schools
Morgan County Schools
Murfreesboro City Schools

N
Newport City Elementary Schools

O
Oak Ridge City Schools
Obion County Schools
Oneida City Schools
Overton County Schools

P
Paris City Special Schools
Perry County Schools
Pickett County Schools
Polk County Schools
Putnam County Schools

R
Rhea County Schools
Richard City Special School District
Roane County Schools
Robertson County Schools
Rogersville City Elementary Schools
Rutherford County Schools

S
Scott County Schools
Sequatchie County Schools
Sevier County Schools
Shelby County Schools
Smith County Schools
South Carroll Special School District
Stewart County Schools
Sullivan County Schools
Sumner County Schools
Sweetwater City Schools

T
Tipton County Schools
Trenton City Schools
Trousdale County Schools
Tullahoma City Schools

U
Unicoi School
Union City Schools
Union County School

V
Van Buren County Schools

W
Warren County Schools
Washington County Schools
Wayne County Schools
Weakley County Schools
West Carroll Special School District
White County Schools
Williamson County Schools
Wilson County Schools

See also
List of high schools in Tennessee

External links
School District Geographical Locator & Information System, Tennessee Department of Education

 
School districts
Tennessee
Local government in Tennessee
School districts